Alexandru Dincă (14 November 1936 – 1998) was a Romanian journalist, opponent of the communist regime.

Biography 

Dincă was born in Bucharest on 14 November 1936. After finishing high-school he became a student at the Faculty of Law of the University of Bucharest. While in his second year, Dincă actively participated in the Bucharest student movement of 1956, being one of the main organizers of the protest rally scheduled in the University Square on 5 November 1956. He was arrested the next day. His interrogation was carried out by lieutenant-colonel Constantin Popescu, captain Gheorghe Enoiu, first lieutenant Iosif Moldovan, first lieutenant Vasile Dumitrescu, first lieutenant Gheorghe Vasile, first lieutenant Constantin Oprea and second lieutenant Nicolae Urucu. He was tried in the "Mitroi group" of opponents and was convicted on 19 April 1957 and sentenced to 6 months imprisonment by sentence No. 534 of the Military Tribunal of Bucharest. He was released after having completed his sentence.

Dincă resumed his studies and graduated from the Bucharest Academy of Economic Studies. He worked as an economist at the Bucharest Road Construction Enterprise. After the Romanian Revolution of 1989 he joined the National Liberal Party, being appointed director of the "Viitorul" newspaper, the official daily of the party.

He died of a heart attack in 1998.

References 
Aduceri aminte şi realitate (Raport SRI din 1991, Arhiva CNSAS - România Liberă - Ediţie Specială 2007

1936 births
1998 deaths
Journalists from Bucharest
Romanian anti-communists
Romanian dissidents
Bucharest Academy of Economic Studies alumni
National Liberal Party (Romania) politicians
20th-century journalists